Cevizlik can refer to:

 Cevizlik, Kemah
 Cevizlik, Yusufeli